Greece competed at the 1924 Summer Olympics in Paris, France. 39 competitors, 38 men and 1 woman, took part in 37 events in 9 sports. Greek athletes did not win any medals, but the gold medal was awarded to sculptor Konstantinos Dimitriadis  for his work Discobole Finlandais. Art competitions were part of the Olympic program from 1912 to 1948. A copy of Dimitriadis's sculpture is situated opposite the Panathenaic Stadium in Athens.

Athletics

Twelve athletes represented Greece in 1924. It was the nation's seventh appearance in the sport.
Ranks given are within the heat.

Aquatics

Swimming

Ranks given are within the heat.

 Men

Water polo

Greece made its second Olympic water polo appearance.

 Roster
 Theodorakis Anastassios
 Andreas Asimakopoulos
 Nikolaos Mavrokordatos Baltatzis
 Georgios Chalkiopoulos
 Nikolaos Kaloudis
 Christos Peppas
 Pantelis Psychas
 Dionysios Vassilopoulos
 E. Vlassis
 C. Vourvoulis

First round

Boxing 

A single boxer represented Greece at the 1924 Games. It was the nation's debut in the sport. Gneftos lost his only bout.

Fencing

Six fencers, all men, represented Greece in 1924. It was the nation's fourth appearance in the sport.

 Men

Ranks given are within the pool.

Shooting

Seven sport shooters represented Greece in 1924. It was the nation's fifth appearance in the sport.

Tennis

 Men

 Women

 Mixed

Wrestling

Greco-Roman

 Men's

References

External links
Official Olympic Reports

Nations at the 1924 Summer Olympics
1924
Olympics